Harvey A. Bennett (born August 9, 1952) is an American former professional ice hockey player. He played center for the Pittsburgh Penguins, Washington Capitals, Philadelphia Flyers, St. Louis Blues, and Minnesota North Stars in a total of 272 National Hockey League (NHL) games over parts of five seasons. His father Harvey Bennett Sr. and two of his brothers (Curt Bennett and Bill Bennett) also played in the NHL. On August 20, 2022, Harvey joined his father, Harvey, Sr., and brother, Curt, as an honored member of the Rhode Island Hockey Hall of Fame.

Playing career
Originally signed as a free agent by the Pittsburgh Penguins after previously playing for the Boston College men's ice hockey team, Bennett also represented the Washington Capitals, Philadelphia Flyers, Minnesota North Stars, and St. Louis Blues during his professional career. He was a member of the United States national team at the inaugural 1976 Canada Cup as well as the 1978 Ice Hockey World Championship tournament.

Career statistics

Regular season and playoffs

External links
 

1952 births
Living people
American men's ice hockey centers
Boston College Eagles men's ice hockey players
Hershey Bears players
Ice hockey players from Rhode Island
Sportspeople from Cranston, Rhode Island
Minnesota North Stars players
Philadelphia Flyers players
Pittsburgh Penguins players
St. Louis Blues players
Undrafted National Hockey League players
Washington Capitals players